Paul Gavan (born 29 November 1965) is an Irish Sinn Féin politician who has served as a Senator for the Labour Panel since April 2016. 

He is Sinn Féin Seanad Spokesperson for Education and Workers Rights. He is also a member of the Parliamentary Assembly of the Council of Europe.

References

External links
Paul Gavan's page on the Sinn Féin website

1965 births
Living people
Alumni of the University of Limerick
Members of the 25th Seanad
Members of the 26th Seanad
Politicians from County Limerick
Sinn Féin senators